Joanna Gruesome were a five-piece noise pop band from Cardiff, Wales. The name of the group is a reference to musician Joanna Newsom. They released two albums and a number of singles.

History
Joanna Gruesome were formed in 2010 in Cardiff. Their debut album received praise from Pitchfork, This is fake DIY, and Rough Trade. Joanna Gruesome were known for their energetic live shows, as well as their forthright feminist and anti-homophobic views.

On 28 November 2014, the band won the Welsh Music Prize with their debut album Weird Sister. They released their second album, Peanut Butter, on 11 May in the UK via Fortuna Pop!, and on 2 June in the US via Slumberland Records.

In June 2015, the band announced Lan McArdle would depart from the band. They were replaced by Kate Stonestreet from the bands Pennycress and Roxy Brennan from Two White Cranes, Grubs and TOWEL. They played their final show in 2017.

Lan McArdle and Owen Williams formed a new band Ex-Vöid in 2018.

Discography

LPs

EPs
E.P. – Self Release, MP3 (2011)
Family Portrait – Art Is Hard Records, 7-inch (2012)
Cream Soda Grrrl – E.P. reissue – Reeks Of Effort, tape (2012)
Split (with Trust Fund) – Reeks Of Effort (UK) & Happy Happy Birthday To Me Records (US), 12-inch EP (2014)
Astonishing Adventures! "The Captured Crusader" (split with Perfect Pussy) – Captured Tracks, Slumberland Records, Fortuna Pop!, 7-inch EP (2014)

Singles
Do You Really Wanna Know Why Yr Still In Love With Me – Happy Happy Birthday To Me Records, 7-inch (2012)
Sugarcrush – Slumberland/Fortuna Pop!, 7-inch Single (2013)

References

External links 
 Joanna Gruesome on Bandcamp

2010 establishments in Wales
Musical groups established in 2010
Musical groups from Cardiff
Underground punk scene in the United Kingdom